Asdrubal or Asdrúbal is a Spanish masculine given name which may refer to:

 Asdrubal Bentes (1939–2020), Brazilian politician and lawyer
 Asdrúbal Cabrera (born 1985), Major League Baseball player from Venezuela
 Asdrúbal Chávez, Venezuelan chemical engineer and politician
 Asdrubal Colmenarez (born 1936), Venezuelan artist
 Asdrúbal Fontes Bayardo (1922–2006), Uruguayan racing driver
 Asdrúbal Padrón (born 1991), Spanish footballer
 Asdrúbal Paniagua (born 1951), Costa Rican retired footballer
 Asdrúbal Sánchez (born 1958), Venezuelan footballer

See also
 Hasdrubal, the original Latin form of the name, chiefly used for Carthaginian leaders

Masculine given names